Passport to China (a.k.a. Visa to Canton) is a 1960 British adventure spy film released by Columbia Pictures; directed by Michael Carreras and starring Richard Basehart, Lisa Gastoni, Eric Pohlmann and Bernard Cribbins. The screenplay, which concerns a pilot who tries to rescue a girl from Communist-controlled China, was based on a story by Gordon Wellesley and made by Swallow Productions and Hammer Films.

Plot
Don Benton (Richard Basehart), a former World War II combat pilot, now running a travel agency in Hong Kong, refuses to take political sides and flatly rejects an offer to do espionage work for the United States.

When Mao Tai Tai (Athene Seyler), an old Chinese woman who more or less adopted Benton during the war years, asks him to try to find her missing grandson.

Knowing that the grandson was piloting a Formosan aircraft that disappeared over mainland China, Benton obtains a passport through a Russian friend, Ivano Kang (Eric Pohlmann). Flying to the mainland, he rescues the downed pilot.

To clear the young man's name, Benton goes to Canton to bring back one of the aircraft passengers, an independent agent, Lola Sanchez (Lisa Gastoni), who has memorized a vital scientific formula and is willing to sell it to the highest bidder.

Kang tries to get the formula from her, but she kills him. Benton hopes to get Lola out of the city, but as they work their way through holiday street crowds, she is fatally wounded by Kang's bodyguard and dies with her secret. Back in Hong Kong, Benton once more turns down an offer to do undercover work for the U.S. government.

Cast

 Richard Basehart as Don Benton
 Lisa Gastoni as Lola Sanchez	
 Athene Seyler as Mao Tai Tai	
 Eric Pohlmann as Ivano Kang	
 Alan Gifford as Orme	
 Bernard Cribbins as Pereira	
Burt Kwouk as Jimmy	
 Marne Maitland as Han Po

Production
Location scenes for Passport to China were filmed in Hong Kong. Released in Great Britain in Technicolor in December 1960 as Visa to Canton, the film was shown in the US in black-and-white. Although the male lead, Richard Basehart had starred in a number of prestigious feature films in the 1950s, by this point in his career, his prospects had faded.

Reception
Film reviewer Sandra Brennan, described the spy drama  as one of a "reluctant hero" who becomes involved in the Cold War tensions surrounding Communist China. Ultimately, "he refuses to do any more work for American intelligence."

References

Notes

Citations

Bibliography

 Aylesworth, Thomas and John S. Bowman. World Guide To Film Stars.  London: Brompton Books, 1991. .
 Quinlan, David. Quinlan's Film Stars. Washington, D.C.: Brassey's, 1996. .

External links
 

1961 films
British adventure films
1960s adventure films
Columbia Pictures films
British aviation films
Cold War films
Films set in Hong Kong
Films shot at Bray Studios
Hammer Film Productions films
1960s English-language films
1960s British films